Earl Powell may refer to:

 Bud Powell (Earl Rudolph Powell, 1924–1966), jazz pianist
 Earl A. Powell III (born 1943), American art historian and museum director